Leslie Pyfer (born c. 1963) is a former artistic gymnast. Pyfer won the USA Gymnastics National Championship in 1979. She competed for the United States at the 1978 and 1979 World Championships.

References

1960s births
Living people
American female artistic gymnasts
21st-century American women